This article shows all participating team squads at the 2011 Women's NORCECA Volleyball Championship, held from September 12 to September 17, 2011 in Caguas, Puerto Rico.

Head Coach: Arnd Ludwig

Head Coach: Braulio Godinez

Head Coach: Juan Carlos Gala

Head Coach: Marcos Kwiek

Head Coach: Mario Herrera

Head Coach: Reynaldo Ortega

Head Coach: David Alemán

Head Coach: Francisco Cruz Jiménez

Head Coach: Hugh McCutcheon

References

External links
 NORCECA

N
N